Municipality Municipality is the first municipal section of Hernando Siles Province in the Chuquisaca Department in Bolivia. Its seat is Monteagudo.

Languages 
The languages spoken in the Monteagudo Municipality are mainly Spanish, Quechua, Guaraní and Aymara.

References 
 obd.descentralizacion.gov.bo

Municipalities of Chuquisaca Department